Count Giacomo Durazzo (27 April 1717 – 15 October 1794) was an Italian diplomat and man of theatre.

Biography
He was born into the House of Durazzo, one of the most important aristocratic families in Genoa. His older brother was the doge Marcello Durazzo. In 1749, he became ambassador to the court in Vienna, where he was appointed director of the imperial theatres in the city in 1754. He is most famous for working with the composer Christoph Willibald Gluck on reforming Italian opera.

In 1750, he married the eighteen-year-old Countess Ernestine Aloisia Ungnad von Weissenwolff (1732–1794). He died in Venice.

References
A. Valenti Durazzo, "I Durazzo da schiavi a dogi della Repubblica di Genova", www.storiadurazzo.com, Chra Principauté de Monaco, 2004.
E. Podestà Giacomo Durazzo da genovese a cittadino d'Europa, Accademia Urbense Ovada, 1992.
M.L. Sebastiani e F. Porticelli, Torino musicale "scrinium" di Vivaldi, Biblioteca Nazionale Universitaria di Torino, Torino 2006.
L.Leoncini (a cura di) "Giacomo Durazzo. Teatro musicale e collezionismo tra Genova, Parigi e Venezia", Grafiche G7 Sas, Savignone (Ge) per Sagep editori, Genova, Giugno 2012.
A.Valenti Durazzo "Il Fratello del Doge. Giacomo Durazzo un illuminista alla Corte degli Asburgo tra Mozart, casanova e Gluck", La Compagnia della Stampa, Maggio 2012.
G.Assereto "Durazzo Giacomo Pier Francesco, in "Dizionario Biografico degli Italiani, 42 (1993) pp.150-153.
A.Lanzola "Melodramma e spettacolo a Vienna: vita e carriera teatrale di Giacomo Durazzo (1717-1794)", tesi di dottorato in lettarature e culture moderne, Università degli Studi di Genova, 2010

1717 births
1794 deaths
18th-century Genoese people
18th-century Italian nobility
18th-century Italian diplomats
Italian opera librettists